Metallosticha aigneri is a species of snout moth in the genus Metallosticha. It was described by Hans Georg Amsel in 1935 and is known from Israel.

References

Moths described in 1935
Phycitini